Frank Hubert Copp (February 2, 1881 – March 9, 1959) was a manufacturer and political figure in New Brunswick, Canada. He represented Westmorland County in the Legislative Assembly of New Brunswick as a Liberal member from 1935 to 1952.

He was born in Bristol, New Brunswick, the son of Adam Bliss Copp and Sarah Jane Oulton. He was educated at Mount Allison University. In 1903, he married Bertha Copp. Copp owned woollen mills and was also involved in fox ranching. He died in 1959.

References 

Canadian Parliamentary Guide, 1948, PG Normandin

1881 births
1959 deaths
20th-century Canadian legislators
Mount Allison University alumni
New Brunswick Liberal Association MLAs
People from Carleton County, New Brunswick